R.S.V.P. is a 1984 American television film starring Harry Reems and Veronica Hart. It features future director Katt Shea in a small role.

References

External links

1984 comedy films
1984 television films
1984 films
American comedy films
American television films
Teen sex comedy films
1980s English-language films
1980s American films